The 2003 RCA Championships was a men's tennis tournament played on outdoor hard courts at the Indianapolis Tennis Center in Indianapolis, Indiana in the United States and was part of the International Series of the 2003 ATP Tour. It was the 16th edition of the tournament and ran from July 21 through July 27, 2003.

Finals

Singles

 Andy Roddick defeated  Paradorn Srichaphan 7–6(7–2), 6–4
 It was Roddick's 3rd title of the year and the 10th of his career.

Doubles

 Mario Ančić /  Andy Ram defeated  Diego Ayala /  Robby Ginepri 2–6, 7–6(7–3), 7–5
 It was Ančić's only title of the year and the 1st of his career. It was Ram's 1st title of the year and the 1st of his career.